Leo Burney (born November 2, 2001) is an American soccer player who plays college soccer at the University of Pennsylvania.

Career
Burney joined the Seattle Sounders FC academy in 2015.  He made his debut for USL club Seattle Sounders FC 2 in August 2018.

References

External links

Penn Athletics Profile

2001 births
Living people
American soccer players
Tacoma Defiance players
Ballard FC players
Association football midfielders
Soccer players from Washington (state)
USL Championship players
USL League Two players
People from Tukwila, Washington
Penn Quakers men's soccer players